The Kattu Narasimhaperumal Temple is a Hindu temple situated in the suburb of Srirangam in Tiruchirappalli, India. It is also known as Azhagiya Singar temple and is situated at a distance of 1 kilometre from the Srirangam railway station.

The temple is also called traditionally "Ekaanthanthaman Koil" meaning "calm and quiet ambience" temple. It is widely believed that the presiding deity grants boons to devotees and is aptly called "Varaprasaaadhi" (boon giver).

Dating the temple
The  temple  was built by the Pandyan King Vallabadevan who was a devotee of Sri Periazhwar in the ninth century CE.

However as per legend and folklore the temple predates the Sri Ranganathaswamy Temple, Srirangam and is one of the oldest temples in the city. Some attribute the temple to be of 5th century CE.

Temple history

In the 12th century CE Sri Pillailokachariar conducted his daily kalakshepam (discourse) on "Vaishnava siddhaantha rahasyangal" (Secrets of the Vaishnava tradition) to his devotees in this temple.  Sri Manavalamamunigal in the 15th century took over temple administration as per the request of the Pandyan ruler Srisindarapandian. The pandyan king provided for temple maintenance.

The Temple entrance arch was built as ordained by Sri Kaattazhgaiyasingar and dedicated in the presence of Sriman Sriranga Narayana Jeeyar of Srirangam temple (Periakoil Jeeyar). More devotees became followers of the deity from there on.

Festivals

Jyeshtabhishekam

Holy water from the river Kollidam is brought by elephant to the temple and Jyeshtabhishekam (divine ablution) is performed.

Sahasra Deepam

A thousand lamps are lit during the Sashradeepam. It occurs during the first Sunday in the Tamil month of Karthigai.

Pradosham

On days of pradosham days, devotees get special darshan (viewing) of Azhagiyasinga Perumal (presiding deity of the temple).

References 

Hindu temples in Tiruchirappalli